Greenfield Reservoir is a reservoir in the Saddleworth parish of the Metropolitan Borough of Oldham in Greater Manchester, in the English Peak District. Lying within the historic boundaries of the West Riding of Yorkshire, above the village of Greenfield, it is on the edge of the Peak District National Park, near the A635 road on Saddleworth Moor. The reservoir is fed by the Greenfield Brook and is above the Yeoman Hey Reservoir, which in turn feeds into Dovestone Reservoir.

Ashton Stalybridge and Dukinfield Waterworks Joint Committee's reservoir scheme in the Greenfield Valley commenced in 1870. Greenfield and the valley's other reservoirs are owned by United Utilities.

References

Reservoirs of the Peak District
Saddleworth
Reservoirs in Greater Manchester